The women's 4 × 100 metres relay at the 2017 IAAF World Relays was held at the Thomas Robinson Stadium on 23 April.

In the final, USA's Tianna Bartoletta started strongly in lane 3, gaining vs the stagger against Jamaica's Simone Facey who was also gaining on Germany's Alexandra Burghardt.  Approaching the first handoff, as Bartoletta passed Brazil's Tânia da Silva waiting in lane 2, Bartoletta lost her balance and crashed to the track.  Da Silva, who was standing in her own lane, was also set off balance, neither USA or Brazil completed their handoff.  The incident seem to echo from the situation between the same two teams at the previous year's Olympics. China's clean first handoff between Liang Xiaojing and Wei Yongli put them into the lead, while Germany's handoff to Lisa Mayer and Jamaica's handoff to Natasha Morrison were hesitant but effective.  Netherlands put their star world champion Dafne Schippers on the second leg.  She rocketed past Wei and put her team into the lead, but after handing off to Madiea Ghafoor, the momentum stopped as China's Tao Yujia rapidly went by.  Inside of them, Germany's Tatjana Pinto ran an exceptional leg, separating from Jamaica's Gayon Evans, Germany passing first to Rebekka Haase with Jamaica's pass to Sashalee Forbes also gaining an edge on China's handoff to Yuan Qiqi.  Free to run, Hasse separated an extra metre from Forbes, who then found her gear and closed back in on Hasse.  But Hasse had too much of a lead, Germany beating Jamaica by a metre with China another two back, holding off a fast closing Naomi Sedney for the Netherlands.

Records
Prior to the competition, the records were as follows:

Schedule

Results

Heats
Qualification: First 2 of each heat (Q) plus the 2 fastest times (q) advanced to the final. The next 8 fastest times qualified for the final B.

Final B

Final

References

4 x 100 metres relay
4 × 100 metres relay
2017 in women's athletics